The Ven. Archdeacon Charles Frederic Roberts MA, FSA (20 January 1862 – 23 March 1942), was a Welsh Anglican clergyman who served as Archdeacon of St Asaph in the Church in Wales from 1935 to 1942.

He was born Llanelidan, Denbighshire, into an ecclesiastical family, the son of the Rev. David Robert, sometime Rector of Llanelidan  and educated at Ruthin School and Christ's College, Cambridge. He was ordained in 1886 and held curacies in Llanelidan, Llanfyllin and Newtown. He was Vicar Choral of St Asaph Cathedral from 1895 to 1897; and Rector of  Llanddulas until 1933 when he became a Canon Residentiary at St Asaph Cathedral.

He died in post on 23 March 1942.

Notes

People from Denbighshire
People educated at Ruthin School
Alumni of Christ's College, Cambridge
20th-century Welsh Anglican priests
Archdeacons of St Asaph
1862 births
1942 deaths

Fellows of the Society of Antiquaries of London